SalamAir is a low-cost airline from Oman headquartered and based at Muscat International Airport.

History
Salam Air is owned by the Muscat National Development and Investment Company (ASAAS) which won a government tender in January 2016. Founded in 2014, ASAAS is a partnership between the State General Reserve Fund, Muscat Municipality, and various pension funds. Oman's Public Authority for Civil Aviation (PACA) had invited bids in 2015 for a low-cost commercial airline operator in Oman.

The airline operates three Airbus A320-200s leased from South America's LATAM Group. Its first aircraft arrived in Muscat on November 18, 2016, to coincide with the country's National Day. It initially served Dubai World Central but the service has switched to Dubai International Airport in October 2017. Since opening, Salam Air has rapidly grown their route network and now fly to over 32 destinations in the Middle East, Asia and Europe.

The introduction of the first Airbus A321neo to the fleet in September 2021 made SalamAir the first airline in Oman in operating the type.

Corporate affairs
, Khalid Al Yahmadi held the chairman position. , the CEO position is held by Mohammed Ahmed.

Destinations

SalamAir serves the following destinations:

Fleet

, the SalamAir fleet consists of the following aircraft:

References

External links

Airlines of Oman
Airlines established in 2016
Low-cost carriers
2016 establishments in Oman
Companies based in Muscat, Oman
Omani brands